The University Daily Kansan is an editorially independent student newspaper serving the University of Kansas. It was founded in 1904.
Its print distribution was only within the university's campus, as well as student apartment complexes throughout Lawrence. It was published weekly during the school year except fall break, spring break, exams and weekly during the summer session excluding holidays. Its circulation is about 12,000. The Kansan used to include a weekly lifestyle magazine named the Jayplay. The University Daily Kansan stopped publishing regular print editions in 2020 due to the COVID-19 Pandemic and removed the paper's circulation boxes on campus.

Its online counterpart, Kansan.com, began operation on the Web in late 1996. Originally called the UDKi (for interactive) it adopted the name of its parent publication three years later.

The newspaper earned the prestigious Newspaper Pacemaker award from the Associated Collegiate Press in 1993, 1994, 1995, 2000, 2004 and 2005. The Kansan was a finalist for the award in 2001 and 2007. Kansan.com, the newspaper's online counterpart, won the Online Pacemaker in 2007, 2008 and 2009.

Grant Snider was a cartoonist for the Daily Kansan as an undergraduate.

References

1904 establishments in Kansas
Student newspapers published in Kansas
University of Kansas